Anthony van Zijlvelt (1640s, Amsterdam – 1700s, Amsterdam), was a Dutch Golden Age engraver and painter.

Biography
According to the RKD he made portrait prints after Pieter Dubordieu and Joachim von Sandrart, but also of his own invention. He was also a painter and draughtsman of marines.

References

External links

Engraved portraits by Zijlevelt on the website of the Amsterdam archives
Anthony van Zylvelt on Artnet

1640s births
1700s deaths
Dutch Golden Age printmakers
Artists from Amsterdam